Un ángel is the second studio album by Argentine singer Pablo Ruiz. It was released in 1988.

Track listing 

 Orgullosa Nena 
 Silbando Por La Calle
 Lady Lady
 Los Juegos Del Amor
 Otro Momento, Otro Lugar
 Oh Mamá, Ella Me Ha Besado
 Linda
 Nena, Estoy Enamorado 
 Quédate junto A Mí
 Cachetada

References 

Pablo Ruiz (singer) albums
1988 albums